Jana Novotná was the defending champion, but she retired from tennis earlier in the year.

Mary Pierce won the title, defeating compatriot Sandrine Testud in the final, 7–6(7–2), 6–1.

Seeds

Draw

Finals

Top half

Bottom half

Qualifying

Seeds

Qualifiers

Lucky losers
  Cara Black

Qualifying draw

First qualifier

Second qualifier

Third qualifier

Fourth qualifier

References

 ITF singles results page

Generali Ladies Linz - Singles